Dr. John Willis Baer (March 2, 1861 – February 8, 1931) was an American official of the United Society of Christian Endeavor. President of Occidental College in Los Angeles (then a Presbyterian school) from 1906 to 1916.  In 1919 was elected Moderator of the General Assembly of the Presbyterian Church in the United States of America.

References

External links
 

1861 births
1931 deaths
American bankers
American Presbyterians
American religious leaders
Presidents of Occidental College